Aeolacris caternaultii is a species of grasshopper in the family Romaleidae, first  described by Joachim Francois Philiberto de Feisthamel in 1837. The species was placed in Xiphicera by Joachim Francois Philiberto de Feisthamel , but moved to Aeolacris by Samuel Hubbard Scudder. 

It belongs to the genus Aeolacris.

Range

The locality of the neotype is Cayenne, French Guiana but is also known from Manaus, Brazil. Another specimen was also found at French Guiana, but is at Tumuc-Humac, Mitaraka, towards Sommet en Cloche.

References

External links 

Romaleidae
Species described in 1837